Zilia Sánchez Dominguez (born -1926) is a Puerto Rico-based Cuban artist from Havana. She started her career as a set designer and an abstract painter for radical theatre groups in Cuba before the Cuban revolution of 1953-59. Sanchez blurs the lines between sculpture and painting by creating canvases layered with three dimensional protrusions and shapes. Her works are minimal in color, and have erotic overtones.

History 

Sánchez was born in Havana, Cuba. Her mother was Cuban and her father Spanish. In 1943 Sánchez studied at the Escuela Nacional de Bellas Artes "San Alejandro" in Havana and later had her first solo exhibition in 1953. Following Fidel Castro's rise to power, Sanchez moved to New York where she studied printmaking at Pratt Institute. 

She currently works in a pre-war wooden studio in the Santurce neighborhood of San Juan, where much of her artwork was destroyed by water damage in 2018 during Hurricane Maria. Her work was included in the influential exhibition Radical Women: Latin American Art, 1960-85 at the Brooklyn Museum in 2018. 

She is a feminist pioneer in contemporary art, and in 2020 her work was featured in the scholarly researched and historic group show My Body My Rules, at the Pérez Art Museum Miami - Sánchez's work is included in the museum collection.

Her Amazonas series features female warriors highlighting the female form and her work has been described as having "sensual contours". Sánchez's art style changed within the beginning years of her creating art. Early into her career she was focused on creating pieces that focused on the informal practices of abstact expressionism and visual language. By the mid-1960's she had started working on her sensual signature stretched canvas works.

Her artwork has been described as "overlooked" and "rarely seen outside of Puerto Rico."

In 2019, the Phillips Collection exhibited her first museum retrospective, covering her 70-year career.

Exhibitions 
1957 - Exposición de pinturas: Zilia Sánchez, Galería Clan, Madrid.
1958 - Museo Nacional de Bellas Artes, Havana.
1970 - Estructuras en secuencia, Museo de Historia, Arqueología y Arte, Universidad de Puerto Rico, San Juan.
1991 - Zilia Sánchez: Tres décadas: Los sesenta, los setenta, los ochenta. Museo Casa Roig, Humacao, Puerto Rico.
 2000 - Heroic/Erotic, Museo de las Américas, San Juan, Puerto Rico.
2013 - Artists Space, New York City. 
2014 - Zilia Sánchez: Heróicas eróticas en Nueva York, Galerie Lelong, New York.
2017 - 57th International Art Exhibition – La Biennale di Venezia, VIVA ARTE VIVA. 
2019 - Soy Isla (I Am an Island), Phillips Collection, Washington, D.C.

References 

1926 births
Living people
20th-century Cuban women artists
21st-century Cuban women artists
Artists from Havana
Cuban contemporary artists
Cuban emigrants to the United States
Cuban women painters
Pratt Institute alumni